School District of Wisconsin Dells is a school district headquartered in Wisconsin Dells, Wisconsin. Its territory includes sections of the counties of Adams, Columbia, Juneau, Marquette, and Sauk.

Municipalities served by the district include Wisconsin Dells, Dell Prairie, Dellona, Delton, Jackson, Lake Delton, Lyndon, New Haven, Newport, and Springville.

Schools
Secondary:
 Wisconsin Dells High School
 Spring Hill Middle School

Primary:
 Lake Delton Elementary School
 Neenah Creek Elementary School
 Spring Hill Elementary School

References

External links
 School District of Wisconsin Dells

School districts in Wisconsin
Education in Adams County, Wisconsin
Education in Columbia County, Wisconsin
Education in Juneau County, Wisconsin
Marquette County, Wisconsin
Education in Sauk County, Wisconsin